SH2 domain-containing protein 1B is a protein that in humans is encoded by the SH2D1B gene.

By binding phosphotyrosines through its free SRC (MIM 190090) homology-2 (SH2) domain, EAT2 regulates signal transduction through receptors expressed on the surface of antigen-presenting cells (Morra et al., 2001).[supplied by OMIM]

Interactions
SH2D1B has been shown to interact with SLAMF1.

References

Further reading